Elections to the Preston Municipal Borough Council were held in late 1950.

Results

1950 English local elections
1950
1950s in Lancashire